The greenish tyrannulet (Phyllomyias virescens) is a species of bird in the family Tyrannidae. It is found in Argentina, Brazil, and Paraguay. Its natural habitats are temperate forests, subtropical or tropical moist lowland forests, and subtropical or tropical moist montane forests.

References

Phyllomyias
Birds described in 1824
Taxonomy articles created by Polbot